The Institute of Coptic Studies (معهد الدراسات القبطية) was founded in 1954 by the Coptic Orthodox Church of Alexandria. It is based in Cairo.

Description
The institute is the Egyptian church's main research centre in subjects of Coptology and for shared in many research about different aspect of Coptology since its establishment.
The Coptic painters Isaac Fanous and Adel Nassief studied in the institute.

The institute is involved in postgraduate studies in Coptic subjects including Coptic music, Coptic art, Coptic iconography and Coptic history.

One of the teachers was Mikhail Girgis El Batanouny, the Coptic music expert.

From 1955 to 1985 Iris Habib Elmasry continued to lecture in Coptic History at the Institute of Coptic Studies.

Foundation
The institute was mainly founded by its first president Professor Aziz Suryal Atiya; who was also the Founder of the Middle East center, University of Utah.
Other prominent Coptologists and Egyptologists contributed to its establishment as Professor Dr Pahor Labib Director of the Coptic Museum in Old Cairo (1951–1965).

See also
Coptology
Coptic iconography
Coptic Orthodox Church
Coptic saints

References

Coptic Orthodox Church
Coptology
1954 establishments in Egypt
Copts in Cairo